Athos Pisoni (born 3 March 1937) is a Brazilian sports shooter. He competed in the mixed skeet event at the 1976 Summer Olympics.

References

External links
 

1937 births
Living people
Brazilian male sport shooters
Olympic shooters of Brazil
Shooters at the 1976 Summer Olympics
Sportspeople from São Paulo
Pan American Games medalists in shooting
Pan American Games gold medalists for Brazil
Pan American Games silver medalists for Brazil
Pan American Games bronze medalists for Brazil
Shooters at the 1975 Pan American Games
20th-century Brazilian people
21st-century Brazilian people